Phlara was a town of ancient Pontus on the road from Berissa to Sebasteia, inhabited during Roman times.

Its site is tentatively located near Yıldızeli/Yeni Han in Asiatic Turkey.

References

Populated places in ancient Pontus
Former populated places in Turkey
Roman towns and cities in Turkey
History of Sivas Province